Garland is an unincorporated community in Miami County, in the U.S. state of Ohio.

History
A post office called Garland was established in 1891, and remained in operation until 1905. In 1906, Garland had about 50 inhabitants.

References

Unincorporated communities in Miami County, Ohio
Unincorporated communities in Ohio